The Paul Chambers discography describes the works of American jazz bassist Paul Chambers, which he recorded from 1955-1969..

Leader/co-leader 
 Chambers' Music (Aladdin/Jazz West, 1956)
 Whims of Chambers (Blue Note, 1957)– recorded in 1956
 Westlake Bounce The Music of John Graas with Philly Joe Jones (Fresh Sound Records, 1957)
 Bass on Top (Blue Note, 1957)
 Paul Chambers Quintet (Blue Note, 1958)– recorded in 1957
 Go (Vee-Jay, 1959)
 Just Friends with Julian "Cannonball" Adderley (Charly/Le Jazz, 1959)
 1st Bassman (Vee-Jay, 1961) – recorded in 1960
 High Step with John Coltrane (Blue Note, 1975) – recorded in 1956
 The East/West Controversy with Hampton Hawes (Xanadu, 1975) – recorded in 1951-57

Sideman 

With Cannonball Adderley
 Presenting Cannonball Adderley (Savoy, 1955)
 Julian "Cannonball" Adderley (EmArcy, 1955)
 Cannonball Adderley Quintet in Chicago (Mercury, 1959) – reissued as Cannonball and Coltrane (Philips, 1965)
 Cannonball Takes Charge (Riverside, 1959)

With Nat Adderley
 Introducing Nat Adderley (Mercury/Wing, 1955) – reissued as Them Adderleys (Limelight, 1966)
 Naturally! (Jazzland, 1961)

With Toshiko Akiyoshi
 The Toshiko Trio (Storyville, 1956)
 Toshiko Mariano and her Big Band (Vee-Jay, 1964)

With Chet Baker
 Chet Baker in New York (Riverside, 1959) – recorded in 1958
 Chet (Riverside, 1959) – recorded in 1958-59

With Kenny Burrell
 Jazzmen of Detroit with Tommy Flanagan, Pepper Adams, Kenny Clarke (Savoy, 1956)
 Introducing Kenny Burrell (Blue Note, 1956)
 John Jenkins with Kenny Burrell (Blue Note, 1957)
 Kenny Burrell & John Coltrane (Prestige 1958)

With Donald Byrd
 Byrd's Word (Savoy, 1955)
 New Formulas from the Jazz Lab (RCA Victor, 1957)
 Motor City Scene (Bethlehem, 1960)

With Sonny Clark
 Sonny's Crib (Blue Note, 1957)
 Sonny Clark Trio (Blue Note, 1957)
 Cool Struttin' (Blue Note, 1958)
 Blues in the Night (Blue Note, 1958)
 My Conception (Blue Note, 1959)

With John Coltrane
 Coltrane (Prestige 1957)
 Blue Train (Blue Note, 1958)
 Bahia (Prestige 1958)
 Black Pearls (Prestige 1958)
 Settin' the Pace (Prestige 1958)
 John Coltrane with the Red Garland Trio (Prestige 1958)
 Soultrane (Prestige 1958)
 Stardust (Prestige 1958)
 The Believer (Prestige 1958)
 The Last Trane (Prestige 1958)
 Bags & Trane (with Milt Jackson, Atlantic, 1960)
 Giant Steps (Atlantic, 1960)
 Lush Life (Prestige 1961)

With Sonny Criss
 This Is Criss! (Prestige, 1966)
 Portrait of Sonny Criss (Prestige, 1967)

With Miles Davis
 Miles (Prestige 1956)
 Collectors' Items (Prestige 1956)
 'Round About Midnight (Columbia, 1957)
 Cookin (Prestige 1957)
 Miles Ahead (Columbia, 1957)
 Relaxin (Prestige 1958)
 Milestones (Columbia, 1958)
 Porgy and Bess (Columbia, 1959)
 Kind of Blue (Columbia, 1959)
 Steamin (Prestige 1960)
 Sketches of Spain (Columbia, 1960)
 Workin (Prestige 1961)
 Jazz at the Plaza Vol. I (Columbia, 1973 [rec. 1958])
 1958 Miles (Columbia, 1974 [rec. 1958])
 Someday My Prince Will Come (Columbia, 1961)
 In Person Friday and Saturday Nights at the Blackhawk, Complete (1961)
 Quiet Nights (Columbia, 1962)
 Miles Davis at Newport 1955–1975: The Bootleg Series Vol. 4 (Columbia Legacy, 2015)

With Kenny Dorham
 Blue Spring (Riverside, 1959)
 Quiet Kenny (Prestige 1959)
 Whistle Stop (Blue Note, 1961)

With Gil Evans
 Gil Evans & Ten (Prestige 1957)
 New Bottle Old Wine (Pacific Jazz, 1958)
 The Individualism of Gil Evans (Verve, 1964)

With Curtis Fuller
 Curtis Fuller with Red Garland (Prestige 1957)
 The Opener (Blue Note, 1957)
 Bone & Bari (Blue Note, 1957)
 Sliding Easy (United Artists, 1959)
 The Curtis Fuller Jazztet (Savoy, 1959)

With Red Garland
 A Garland of Red (Prestige 1956)
 Red Garland's Piano (Prestige, 1957)
 Groovy (Prestige, 1957)
 Red Garland Revisited! (Prestige, 1957 [1969])
 The P.C. Blues (Prestige, 1957)
 Dig It! (Prestige, 1958)
 Can't See for Lookin' (Prestige, 1958)
 It's a Blue World (Prestige, 1958)
 Manteca (Prestige, 1958)
 The Red Garland Trio (Moodsville, 1958 [1960])
 All Kinds of Weather (Prestige 1959)
 Red in Blues-ville (Prestige 1959)

With Benny Golson
 Benny Golson's New York Scene (Contemporary, 1957)
 The Modern Touch (Riverside, 1958)
 Groovin' with Golson (New Jazz, 1959)
 Pop + Jazz = Swing (Audio Fidelity, 1961)
 Turning Point (Mercury, 1962)

With Dexter Gordon
 Dexter Calling... (Blue Note, 1961)
Landslide (Blue Note, 1961-62 [1980])

With Bennie Green
 Bennie Green Blows His Horn (Prestige 1955)
 The 45 Session (Blue Note, 1958)
 Glidin' Along (Jazzland, 1961)

With Johnny Griffin
 A Blowin' Session (Blue Note, 1957)
 The Congregation (Blue Note, 1957)

With Jimmy Heath
 The Thumper (Riverside, 1959)
 On the Trail (Riverside, 1964)

With Joe Henderson
 Four (Verve, 1968)
 Straight, No Chaser (Verve, 1968)

With Elmo Hope
 Informal Jazz (Prestige 1956)
 Here's Hope! (Celebrity, 1961)
 High Hope! (Beacon, 1961)

With Milt Jackson
 Bags' Opus (United Artists, 1959) – recorded in 1958
 Bags & Trane (Atlantic, (w/John Coltrane) 1960)
 Statements (Impulse!, 1961)

With J. J. Johnson
 The Eminent Jay Jay Johnson Volume 2 (Blue Note, 1955)
 Trombone for Two (with Kai Winding, Columbia, 1955)
 First Place (Columbia, 1957)
 The Great Kai & J. J. (w/Kai Winding) (Impulse!, 1960)

With Philly Joe Jones
 Philly Joe's Beat ([Atlantic, 1960)
 Together! (Atlantic, 1961)

With Wynton Kelly
 Piano (Riverside, 1958)
 Kelly Blue (Riverside, 1959)
 Kelly at Midnight (Vee-Jay, 1960)
 Kelly Great (Vee-Jay, 1960)
 Wynton Kelly! (Vee-Jay, 1961)
 Comin' in the Back Door (Verve, 1963)
 It's All Right! (Verve, 1964)
 Undiluted (Verve, 1965)
 Blues on Purpose (Xanadu, 1965)
 Last Trio Session (Delmark, 1968)

With King Curtis
The New Scene of King Curtis (New Jazz, 1960)
 Soul Meeting  (Prestige, 1960)

With Abbey Lincoln
 That's Him! (Riverside, 1957)
 It's Magic (Riverside, 1958)

With Les McCann
 Soul Hits (Pacific Jazz, 1963)
 A Bag of Gold (Pacific Jazz, 1966) – recorded in 1963

With Hal McKusick
 Triple Exposure (Prestige, 1957)
 Cross Section-Saxes (Decca, 1958)

With Jackie McLean
 Jackie's Pal (Prestige, 1956)
 McLean's Scene (Prestige/New Jazz, 1957)
 Strange Blues (Prestige, 1957)
 Jackie's Bag (Blue Note, 1959)
 New Soil (Blue Note, 1959)
 Capuchin Swing (Blue Note, 1960)

With Hank Mobley
 Tenor Conclave (Prestige 1957) – recorded in 1956
 Hank Mobley Sextet (Blue Note, 1957) – recorded in 1956
 Peckin' Time (Blue Note, 1959) – recorded in 1958
 Soul Station (Blue Note, 1960)
 Roll Call (Blue Note, 1961) – recorded in 1960
 Workout (Blue Note, 1962) – recorded in 1961
 The Turnaround! (Blue Note, 1965) – recorded in 1963-65
 Another Workout (Blue Note, 1985) – recorded in 1961

With Lee Morgan
 Lee Morgan Sextet (Blue Note, 1956)
 Lee Morgan Vol. 3 (Blue Note, 1957)
 City Lights (Blue Note, 1957)
 The Cooker (Blue Note, 1957)
 Lee-Way (Blue Note, 1960)
 Here's Lee Morgan (Vee-Jay, 1960)
 Charisma (Blue Note, 1966)
 The Rajah (Blue Note, 1966)

With Wes Montgomery
 Full House (Riverside, 1962)
 Smokin' at the Half Note (Verve, 1965)
 Willow Weep for Me (Verve, 1969)

With Art Pepper
 Art Pepper Meets the Rhythm Section (Contemporary, 1957)
 Gettin' Together (Contemporary, 1960)

With Bud Powell
 Bud! The Amazing Bud Powell (Vol. 3) (Blue Note, 1957)
 The Scene Changes: The Amazing Bud Powell (Vol. 5) (Blue Note, 1958)

With Freddie Redd
 Shades of Redd (Blue Note, 1960)
 Redd's Blues (Blue Note, 1961)

With Sonny Rollins
 Tenor Madness (Prestige 1956)
 Sonny Rollins, Vol. 2 (Blue Note, 1957)
 The Sound of Sonny (Riverside, 1957)

With others
 Pepper Adams,Pepper Adams Plays the Compositions of Charlie Mingus (Workshop Jazz, 1964) – recorded in 1963
 Lorez Alexandria, Alexandria the Great (Impulse!, 1964)
 Gene Ammons, Jammin' in Hi Fi with Gene Ammons (Prestige, 1957)
 Walter Benton, Out of This World (Jazzland, 1960)
 Bob Brookmeyer, Jazz Is a Kick (Mercury, 1960)
 Tina Brooks, Back to the Tracks (Blue Note, 1960)
 Jaki Byard, On the Spot! (Prestige, 1967)
 Kenny Clarke,Bohemia After Dark (Savoy, 1955)
 Jimmy Cleveland, Introducing Jimmy Cleveland and His All Stars (EmArcy, 1955)
 John Graas, Jazz Lab 2 (Decca, 1957)
 Kenny Drew, Kenny Drew Trio (Riverside, 1956)
 Teddy Edwards, Nothin' But the Truth! (Prestige, 1966)
 Bill Evans, On Green Dolphin Street (Riverside, 1959)
 Jane Fielding and the Kenny Drew Quintet, Embers Glow (Jazz:West, 1956)
 Grant Green, First Session (Blue Note, 1960)
 Gigi Gryce,Jazz Lab (Jubilee, 1958) with Donald Byrd
 Herbie Hancock, Inventions and Dimensions (Blue Note, 1963)
 Barry Harris, Bull's Eye! (Prestige, 1968)
 Hampton Hawes, Bird Song (Contemporary, 1956 [1999])
 Roy Haynes, We Three (New Jazz, 1959)
 Ernie Henry, Last Chorus (Riverside, 1956–57)
 Richard "Groove" Holmes, Get Up & Get It! (Prestige, 1967)
 Freddie Hubbard, Goin' Up (Blue Note, 1960)
 John Jenkins, John Jenkins with Kenny Burrell (Blue Note, 1957)
 Elvin Jones, And Then Again (Atlantic, 1965)
 Hank Jones, Hank Jones' Quartet (Savoy, 1956)
 Thad Jones, After Hours (Prestige, 1957)
 Quincy Jones, This Is How I Feel About Jazz (ABC-Paramount, 1957)
 Clifford Jordan, Cliff Jordan (Blue Note, 1957)
 Warne Marsh, Warne Marsh (Atlantic, 1958)
 Blue Mitchell, Out of the Blue (Riverside, 1958)
 Thelonious Monk, Brilliant Corners (Riverside, 1956)
 Oliver Nelson, The Blues and the Abstract Truth (Impulse!, 1961)
 Phineas Newborn Jr., A World of Piano! (Contemporary, 1961)
 David "Fathead" Newman, Straight Ahead (Atlantic, 1961)
 Houston Person, Trust in Me (Prestige, 1967)
 The Prestige All Stars, Interplay for 2 Trumpets and 2 Tenors (Prestige, 1957)
 Ike Quebec, Blue and Sentimental (Blue Note, 1961)
 Paul Quinichette, Moods (EmArcy, 1954)
 Sonny Red, Out of the Blue (Blue Note, 1960)
 Dizzy Reece, Star Bright (Blue Note, 1959)
 A. K. Salim, Pretty for the People (Savoy, 1957)
 Sahib Shihab, Jazz Sahib (Savoy, 1957)
 Woody Shaw, In the Beginning (Muse, 1983) – recorded in 1965 
 Wayne Shorter, Introducing Wayne Shorter (Vee-Jay, 1959)
 Louis Smith, Smithville (Blue Note, 1958)
 Sonny Stitt, Sonny Stitt - Previously Unreleased Recordings (Verve, 1973) – recorded in 1960
 Frank Strozier, Fantastic Frank Strozier (Vee-Jay, 1960)
 Art Taylor, A.T.'s Delight (Blue Note, 1960)
 Clark Terry, Serenade to a Bus Seat (Riverside, 1957)
 Stanley Turrentine, ZT's Blues (Blue Note, 1961)
 George Wallington, Live at the Café Bohemia (Progressive, 1955)
 Julius Watkins and Charlie Rouse, Les Jazz Modes (Dawn, 1957)

References 

Discographies of American artists
Jazz discographies